Moishe Mana (born 1956) is a billionaire businessman, and real estate developer. Originally from Israel, Mana emigrated to the US in 1983, where he founded his first business, Moishe's Moving Systems. He started further businesses including GRM Document Management, the country's third largest document storage business, Milk Studios, a media and entertainment conglomerate, and Mana Contemporary, an art center.

Early life 
Moishe grew up in the Hatikva neighborhood of Tel Aviv, the second of five children in a poor family. His parents were Iraqi-born immigrants who worked in various businesses, including real estate. After serving as an intelligence officer in the IDF, he studied law at Tel Aviv University for a year before leaving to pursue business in the private sector.

Career in New York 
Moishe moved to New York City in 1983 with little money. He slept on park benches, and his first job was as a dishwasher in Greenwich Village. He transitioned into the construction industry, where a short-on-cash employer allowed him the use of the company van at night in lieu of wages. In a widely reported NYC "Rags to Riches" story, Moishe saved enough money to buy his own van. Realizing that anyone with a van and a strong back could start a moving company in 1980s New York, Moishe quickly began hiring other Israeli immigrants, and was able to swiftly undercut his competition. Within six years his company was one of the city's top residential movers. It eventually evolved into Moishe's Moving Logistics.

Moishe's Moving Logistics 
By the late 1980s Moishe's Moving Logistics had become the largest moving company in the tri-state area. As the company grew, Moishe began purchasing warehouse space and offering storage solutions. By 1998, he had amassed more than 1.5 million square feet of commercial real estate. Today, Moishe owns a conglomerate of fifteen companies including Moishe's Guarantee Asset Management, Mana Fine Arts, Moishe's Guarantee Wine Storage, GRM Information Management, Moishe's Self Storage, and MANA Common (New Jersey, Chicago, Wynwood, and Downtown Miami).

GRM Information Management 
Mana launched GRM Information Management in 1986, and it is now the third largest document and digital storage company in the US, with additional branches in China and Latin America. It was the first document storage company to utilize barcodes in its warehouses. In 2011, the former CEO of Emptoris, Avner Schneur, took charge of GRM.

MILK Studios 
In 1995, Mana began to focus on the Meatpacking District of New York City, which was then an underdeveloped part of Manhattan. Fashion entrepreneur Mazdack Rassi convinced him to convert one of his mini storage facilities into an event and office space, and thus MILK Studios was born.

Mana opened MILK Studios Los Angeles, and today the MILK Group includes a number of additional companies: MILK Agency, a brand development outfit; Velem, a post production studio; Milk Makeup; and House Casting. The NYC location also operates MILK Gallery, an art space.

MANA Contemporary 
By the late 2000s Mana had become a contemporary art collector. He questioned how art was collected, stored, and managed in cloistered facilities.

In 2009, Mana and his long-time business partner Eugene Lemay began assembling over two million square feet of empty warehouses in Jersey City, New Jersey for the purposes of disrupting the art storage market. He then converted this assemblage into an arts community called Mana Contemporary. With services, spaces, and programming for artists, collectors, curators, performers, students and community, MANA Contemporary includes artist studios, living space, creative, photography, fashion, exhibition spaces, and storage.

MANA Contemporary Chicago 
Mana set his sights on developing an arts community in the Chicago neighborhood of Pilsen. MANA Contemporary Chicago houses dozens of artists studios, exhibition spaces, classrooms, a central cafe, a library, and more. The Pilsen cultural complex is composed of the 450,000 square foot building plus additional land marked for residential and commercial development.

MANA Wynwood 
In 2009 Moishe Mana took on the challenge of transforming Miami from a tourist destination into a vibrant, diversified city with art, fashion, technology, and a global trading hub that connects South America, the Far East, and North America.

Mana began laying the groundwork for a massive business and art complex in the Wynwood neighborhood of Miami, Florida by purchasing acres and acres of underused warehouses and vacant lots. Among his purchases were a former free trade zone. The assemblage, MANA Wynwood, accommodates large scale productions from feature films and television shows to events and trade shows, doubling as a convention center or concert venue, hosting art openings, fashion shows, block parties, and the monthly ritual that has become a cultural touchstone in the area: the Wynwood Art Walk. As Mana's presence in the area helped shape an artistic renaissance, the neighborhood has rapidly changed, evolving into a hyper-Instagrammable hipster mecca dotted with street murals  and boutique businesses.

Mana has gotten approval from the city to start building a ten million square foot hub that will facilitate all trade between the Far East, South America, and North America. Named the China-Latin America Trade Hub, the facility is designed to service companies involved in that trade stream. The broader development project includes facilities that will serve creative industries such as fashion, technology, and entertainment. The complex is designed to have over three million square feet of showrooms and future corporate global headquarters in one neighborhood. The complex will also host banking, agriculture, global manufacturers, and other diversified industries, all of which will be backed by digital platforms. Mana's ultimate goal is to develop Miami into a mini Hong Kong due to its location and its international fabric. It is estimated that building the project would create 14,850 non-recurring jobs. Once it's completed, MANA Wynwood would create more than 19,400 direct and indirect jobs.

MANA Common Project - Flagler District 
Moishe Mana is pursuing a second project in Miami, the MANA Common Project, which will be located in the newly created Flagler District of Downtown Miami. This development will consist of over 45 assembled buildings spanning four streets, all of which he has purchased between 2013 and the present.

Taking advantage of Miami's unique zoning laws which allow anyone who owns more than nine contiguous acres of property to apply for a special zoning district, Mana's current plan is to renovate the existing building and create a collaborative community where residents can live, work, and play in over 5,000 micro-units, and the community can come together in collaborative working spaces. The strategy is in furtherance of his belief that investing in people's talents and passion is infinitely more rewarding than being a mere landlord, leading him to invest in numerous startups in multiple industries. The plan also represents an addition of sorely needed middle income housing for a city suffering from a housing crisis.

MANA Contemporary Miami 
Based in the historic 777 International Mall in Downtown Miami, Contemporary Miami is a growing arts center that unites artist studios, exhibition spaces, and programming to facilitate conversation and collaboration among its creative community. Established in 2017, MANA Contemporary Miami is primarily focused on connecting with Miami-based artists and organizations, with the idea of further creating new avenues for conversation and opportunities, ultimately serving as an ongoing platform to engage Miami arts and culture in dynamic and sustainable ways. The center has most recently hosted a series of pop-up spaces and studios for local artists.

Political activism and philanthropy 
Mana has vocally opposed Donald Trump. During Trump's campaign for the office of the presidency, Mana offered to donate first one million, then two million dollars to the charity of Trump's choice in exchange for the presidential candidate making his tax returns public.

The September before Trump's election, a naked statue of him appeared atop one of Mana's Wynwood offices. The statue was subsequently stolen and returned, albeit headless.

Mana also commissioned a large mural of then-candidate Trump which luridly depicted the developer-turned-politician as The Joker from The Dark Knight. The mural was modified after the election by the original artists to remove Trump's likeness.

Mana donated $10 million to Florida International University's CARTA (College of Communication, Architecture + The Arts) Program. The gift is $2.5 million in cash and an in-kind donation of 15,000 square feet of studio and classroom space at MANA Wynwood.

References

1950s births
Living people
20th-century American Jews
Israeli emigrants to the United States
People from Tel Aviv
American real estate businesspeople
American billionaires
American people of Iraqi-Jewish descent
21st-century American Jews